In August 1979, a Constitutional Convention election was held in parts of the Kordestan Province with plurality-at-large voting format in order to decide two seats for the Assembly for the Final Review of the Constitution.

Results 

 
 
|-
|colspan="14" style="background:#E9E9E9;"|
|-
 
 
 
 
 
 
 
 

|-
|colspan=14|
|-
|colspan=14|Source:

References

1979 elections in Iran
Kurdistan Province